Adraneothrips is a genus of thrips in the family Phlaeothripidae. The genus has its highest species diversity in the New World, particularly the Neotropics, though species are also known from Asia, Australia and Africa.

Many species in Adraneothrips have two-color patterns, and sexual dimorphism is limited. They are associated with leaf litter and other dead leaves, and are presumed mycophagous.

Species
 Adraneothrips abdominalis
 Adraneothrips acutulus
 Adraneothrips acutus
 Adraneothrips alajuela
 Adraneothrips albicollis
 Adraneothrips alternatus
 Adraneothrips andrei
 Adraneothrips antennatus
 Adraneothrips apalus
 Adraneothrips aztecus
 Adraneothrips bambusae
 Adraneothrips bellus
 Adraneothrips biadenes
 Adraneothrips bilineatus
 Adraneothrips braccatus
 Adraneothrips brasiliensis
 Adraneothrips cautus
 Adraneothrips chinensis
 Adraneothrips cinctiventris
 Adraneothrips coloratus
 Adraneothrips darwini
 Adraneothrips decorus
 Adraneothrips desocellatus
 Adraneothrips diligens
 Adraneothrips disjunctus
 Adraneothrips elegans
 Adraneothrips ephippium
 Adraneothrips exiguus
 Adraneothrips falsus
 Adraneothrips faustus
 Adraneothrips fuscicollis
 Adraneothrips gandoca
 Adraneothrips hani
 Adraneothrips hoffi
 Adraneothrips huachucae
 Adraneothrips imbecillus
 Adraneothrips inca
 Adraneothrips infirmus
 Adraneothrips inflavus
 Adraneothrips laticeps
 Adraneothrips lepidus
 Adraneothrips limpidus
 Adraneothrips madrasensis
 Adraneothrips makilingensis
 Adraneothrips microsetis
 Adraneothrips nilgiriensis
 Adraneothrips obliquus
 Adraneothrips oculatus
 Adraneothrips okajimai
 Adraneothrips onustus
 Adraneothrips opacus
 Adraneothrips pallidus
 Adraneothrips peruviensis
 Adraneothrips pinicola
 Adraneothrips poecilonotus
 Adraneothrips pteris
 Adraneothrips pulchellus
 Adraneothrips rostratus
 Adraneothrips russatus
 Adraneothrips saturatus
 Adraneothrips septimanus
 Adraneothrips setosus
 Adraneothrips silvaticus
 Adraneothrips simulator
 Adraneothrips spadix
 Adraneothrips stannardi
 Adraneothrips stenocephalus
 Adraneothrips strasseni
 Adraneothrips tibialis
 Adraneothrips transversus
 Adraneothrips tupi
 Adraneothrips uniformis
 Adraneothrips vacuus
 Adraneothrips waui
 Adraneothrips xanthosoma
 Adraneothrips yunnanensis

References

Phlaeothripidae
Thrips
Thrips genera